The National Assembly is the unicameral legislature of Togo. It has a total of 91 members who are elected in a party list proportional representation system. Members serve five-year terms.

See also
List of presidents of the National Assembly of Togo
History of Togo
Politics of Togo
List of legislatures by country
Legislative branch

References

External links
 

Government of Togo
Politics of Togo
Political organisations based in Togo
Togo
Togo
1960 establishments in Togo